Sarah Althea Hill (March 26, 1850 – February 14, 1937) was a socialite, mistress, and mentally unstable woman with a history of violent behavior who became a national celebrity when she sued millionaire Senator William Sharon for divorce, citing adultery, in 1883. She claimed he had secretly married her three years earlier in a private contract. She was known to carry a small-caliber Colt revolver in her purse and did not hesitate to threaten all who crossed her. The divorce case and related lawsuits set legal precedent and spawned numerous spinoff lawsuits that dragged on for nearly a decade. Two months after Sharon died, she married her attorney David S. Terry.

Early years 

Hill was born in Pleasant Hill, Missouri, the daughter of attorney Samuel H. Hill and Julia Sloan. Her older brother was Hiram Morgan Hill, for whom the California town of Morgan Hill is named. Both of their parents died while they were minors, leaving them to be cared for by relatives. When they came of age, they received $20,000 (or about  $ today) each as their inheritance from their parents.

In 1871, at the age of 21, Hill came to San Francisco with her brother, where they lived with their relatives, William and Ada Bryan. In 1880, she had a love affair with attorney Reuben H. Lloyd. When he ended the affair, she attempted suicide on May 10, 1880, in his office by drinking poison. She was saved when her stomach was pumped.

San Francisco socialite 

In the fall of 1880, at age 30, Hill met millionaire Senator William Sharon, the president of the Bank of California, the owner of the Palace Hotel, and other properties. At the time, he was 60, a widower, and one of the richest men in the country. He gave her $500 (about $ today) per month and a room in the San Francisco Grand Hotel, adjoining the Palace Hotel where he lived, for the pleasure of her companionship. After just over a year, he tried to end the relationship, but she would not agree. He finally evicted her from the room by having the carpets ripped up and the door hinges removed, along with a $7,500 (around $) payment. When he began a relationship with another woman, she claimed to be his wife and sued him for divorce, claiming adultery.

One of her attorneys was David S. Terry. Sharon claimed he had hired Hill merely as his mistress. Hill produced a marriage contract dated August 20, 1880, and said Sharon had sworn her to secrecy for two years. His reasons, she testified, were that he was up for re-election and could not afford the scandal that would result when his mistress back east heard about the marriage. Sharon countersued, claiming that the marriage contract she produced was fraudulent.

Sharon vs. Sharon 
Hill initially won the first case in December 1884. Judge Jeremiah F. Sullivan declared her the legal wife of William Sharon and awarded her alimony and the right to half of his accumulated wealth since the date of their marriage. Because of continuing counter-suits and appeals, Hill never received any of Sharon's money.

William Sharon died on November 13, 1885. Hill produced a handwritten will, supposedly made not long before his death, that she said she found in his desk.  Those who knew Sharon doubted its authenticity. It gave Sharon's entire estate to Hill and nothing to his son Frederick and son-in-law Frank Newlands. On January 7, 1886, Hill married one of her lawyers, former California Supreme Court Justice David S. Terry. Terry was well known for killing Senator David C. Broderick in a duel in 1859. Hill and Terry were married at St. Mary's Church in Stockton, California, Terry's home town.
The Sharon family continued to fight Hill.

As was the custom at the time, U.S. Supreme Court Associate Justice Stephen Johnson Field was assigned to assist the California Circuit Court. He was coincidentally assigned to the Sharon vs. Sharon case. After William Sharon died, his son and son-in-law carried on the case. Many were suspicious of the authenticity of the will Hill claimed to have found. Hill's expenses were primarily bankrolled by her friend, Mary Ellen Pleasant, an elderly black entrepreneur. The lawsuit propelled Hill into the national spotlight and earned her the nickname, The Rose of Sharon.

In January 1886, a U.S. Circuit Court Judge and a U.S. District Court Judge sitting as a Circuit Judge rendered a decision against the defendants. They ruled that the marriage contract was a forgery and required the plaintiffs to turn over the document so that it could be nullified by the court. The Terrys refused to comply with the Court's order and were jailed. They returned to the court in March 1888, seeking further relief.

On September 3, 1888, Field delivered the final Circuit Court opinion. He ruled that the will was a forgery. Sarah Althea Hill suddenly stood up, screamed obscenities at the judge, and fumbled in her handbag for her revolver. When Marshal John Franks and others attempted to escort her from the courtroom, attorney Terry rose to defend his wife and drew his Bowie knife. He hit Franks, knocking out a tooth, and the marshals drew their handguns. Spectators subdued Terry and led him out of the courtroom, where he pulled his Bowie knife and threatened all around him. David Neagle was among the Marshals present and put his pistol in Terry's face.  Both Terrys were subdued and placed under arrest. Justice Field had them returned to the courtroom and sentenced both to jail for contempt of court. David Terry got  six months in jail, and Sarah Terry got one month.

While being transported to jail and while serving their sentences, Terry and his wife repeatedly threatened Justice Field. The Terrys suffered several more setbacks. Both David and Althea were indicted by a federal grand jury on criminal charges arising out of their behavior in the courtroom before Justice Field. In May 1889, the U.S. Supreme Court refused to review the order that invalidated Althea Terry's marriage contract with Senator Sharon. Then, in July, with only one of the four judges who had earlier ruled in their favor, the California Supreme Court reversed itself. It ruled that because Althea Terry and Sharon had kept their alleged marriage a secret, they were never legally married. While in jail or shortly afterward, pregnant Althea suffered a miscarriage.

Attack expected 

The newspapers followed the case and repeatedly speculated about the likelihood of an attack on Field. When Field returned to California as a circuit riding judge for the 9th Circuit Court again the next year, U.S. Attorney General William Miller instructed Marshal Franks on May 6, 1889, to appoint Neagle as a Marshal with the responsibility to protect Field.

Terry killed 

When David and Althea Terry were released from jail, they returned to Fresno. On August 14, 1889, they boarded a train in Fresno on which unknown to them Field and Neagle were returning from Los Angeles. At 7:10 am, all of the passengers disembarked the train to eat breakfast in the railroad station dining room at Lathrop, California. After entering the dining room, Althea Terry saw Field. She quickly exited and returned to her railroad car, apparently to fetch her satchel in which she was known to carry a pistol. When her husband saw Field, he walked behind him and slapped Field twice with such force that his glasses were knocked off.

Neagle, who was 5'7" tall and weighed 145 pounds, testified that the 6'3", 250-pound Terry recognized Neagle from the earlier confrontation in the courtroom. Neagle later said he saw a look of determination and victory on Terry's face. Neagle rose from his chair and said, "Stop that! I am an officer." Terry drew back his hand again and Neagle drew his .45-caliber revolver and shot Terry at point-blank range in the heart. Neagle announced to the 80 to 100 people in the dining room, "I am a United States Marshal and I defy anyone to touch me!" Field told them that Terry had assaulted him "and my officer shot him."

Althea Hill Terry had been held at the door by one of the dining room proprietors, who had searched the satchel and found a gun within it. She screamed and pushed her way through the crowd, throwing herself over her husband's body. Neagle thought he saw her covertly remove David Terry's knife from his vest. She challenged the crowd to search his body, insistent he was unarmed. The knife was later found in her satchel with the pistol.

Declared insane 

After her husband's death, Sarah Terry became obsessed with spiritualism, hiring medium after medium to put her in touch with David Terry. Eventually, since she had no money to hire lawyers, the Sharon case gradually came to an end as the final cases were either dismissed or quickly decided against her. By February, 1892, newspapers were reporting that Mrs. Terry was insane. She wandered aimlessly in the streets of San Francisco, ignoring her appearance. She constantly talked to "spirits," especially that of her husband, and could not sleep. She had periods of violence and believed that she was being tormented by electricity and hypnotism.

Abandoned by her relatives since the beginning of the Sharon case, Terry's fate was left to the only friends she had left, R. Porter Ashe and Mary Ellen Pleasant. Pleasant initiated action to have Terry committed to an insane asylum. After a brief examination by the Insanity Commission, Sarah Terry was committed at age 33 to the California Asylum at Stockton (later known as the Stockton State Hospital) on March 11, 1892.

Diagnosed with "dementia praecox," an early term for schizophrenia, she was extremely violent and had to be restrained for years in the asylum. Despite being termed "our best known patient" by Dr. Asa Clark, the hospital superintendent, Terry received almost no visitors over the years other than a few authors researching her case. She was not treated except with sedatives and eventually adapted to her life in the institution but was deluded into thinking that she was a rich and grand lady, the hospital was her mansion, and the staff her servants.

She remained incarcerated for forty-five years, from ages 42 to 86. When she died of pneumonia, Cornelia Terry, the granddaughter of David Terry, stepped forward to offer her a proper burial, saving Sarah Terry from being buried on the hospital grounds. Sarah Althea Hill Terry is buried in the Terry family plot in the Stockton Rural Cemetery.

References

Other sources 

 Holdredge, Helen (1953). Mammy Pleasant. New York City: G. P. Putnam and Sons. ISBN ASIN: B0006ATHHQ.
 W. H. L. Barnes, Argument for the Defendant, Sarah Althea Sharon vs. William Sharon (San Francisco: Barry, Baird & Co., 1884).
 Oscar T. Shuck, ed., History of the bench and bar of California (Los Angeles: The Commercial Printing House, 1901).
 John D. Lawson, ed., American State Trials, Volume XV (St. Louis: Thomas Law Book Co., 1926).

1850 births
1937 deaths
People from San Francisco
People from Cape Girardeau, Missouri
Deaths from pneumonia in California